The 2017–18 EuroCup Basketball Playoffs began on 6 March and end on 13 or 16 April 2018 with the second or third leg, if necessary, of the 2018 EuroCup Finals, to decide the champions of the 2017–18 EuroCup Basketball. Eight teams compete in the playoffs.

Times up to 24 March 2018 are CET (UTC+1), thereafter (third leg semifinals and finals) times are CEST (UTC+2).

Format
The playoffs involves the eight teams which qualified as winners and runners-up of each of the four groups in the 2017–18 EuroCup Basketball Top 16.

Each tie in the playoffs, apart from the final, is played with a best-of-three-games format. The team that performed better in the Top 16 will play the games first and third, if necessary, at home.

Qualified teams

Standings

Bracket

Quarterfinals

The first legs were played on 6 March, the second legs were played on 9 March and the third legs, if necessary, were played on 14 March 2018.

|}

First leg

Second leg

Third leg

Semifinals

The first legs were played on 20 March, the second legs were played on 23 March, and the third legs were scheduled for 28 March 2018.

|}

First leg

Second leg

Finals

The first leg will be played on 10 April, the second leg will be played on 13 April, and the third leg was scheduled to 16 April 2018, if necessary.

|}

First leg

Second leg

References

External links
EuroCup Basketball (official website)

2017–18 EuroCup Basketball